Azukibabaa (あずきばばあ, the bean hag) is a monster from Miyagi prefecture to the Kanto region. This is an old woman's yokai that makes the sound of adzuki, just like Azukiarai. There is a theory that, instead of a different type of red bean-washing monster, the true nature of red bean washing is called "Azuma-gama" in some areas.

Local lore
 Kawagoe City, Saitama Prefecture
 It is said that at the abandoned temple in Shimo-Kosaka-mura, it made a sound of red beans when it was raining in the evening. In this region, parents said to their children who did not keep up with their parents, saying: "I will be attacked by Shodouba".
 Gunma Prefecture
 Appears in a stream near Takasaki Castle. At night, they make the sound of red beans while singing, "Would you like to wash or eat the red beans?" And swallow those who pass nearby into the bright light. In order to avoid this strangeness, it is better to calm yourself by holding your thumb.
 In Showa-mura, Tone-gun, they make the sound of stirring azuki beans in a pot in a swamp, and sing like "Azuki Togo or Catch and Eat" as well as Azuki Togi. It is said to be Mujin or Itachi.
 Tokyo
 On the moonlight of autumn, a small voice was heard from the brook saying, "One red bean, two red bean sasam...", and at dawn, the old woman in a white outfit and holding a zebra disappeared into the.
 It is said that Shodobo also appeared in the man well woman well in Ome city where the legend of Kobo Daishi remains
 Nakamaru Kakigihira, Kiyoharu Village, Kita-Koma District, Yamanashi Prefecture
 Also called Azuki Sagima.  He lives on an Amandou tree near Suwa Shrine, and calls a person who passes nearby at night saying "Azuki Anna Anna (meaning to eat azuki)" and he is surprised. If you are panicking, you will be scooped up by a large tree. A yokai researcher, Kenji Murakami, has a connection with a youkai / Tsurube-otoshi that is also said to scoop up people from the top of a tree.
 Kawawa Town, Tsuzuki Ward, Yokohama City, Kanagawa Prefecture
 Like Saitama Prefecture, it is spoken as a shrine mackerel as a child threatening monster.
 Nishi Narita, Tomiya City, Miyagi Prefecture
 Youkai similar to red bean washing. Called azuki bean, she appears as an old woman in a brook at sunset. Fox is said to be true.

See also
 List of legendary creatures from Japan

References

Japanese mythology
Japanese legendary creatures
Yōkai